Six regiments of the British Army have been numbered the 99th Regiment of Foot:

99th Regiment of Foot (1760), raised in 1761
99th Regiment of Foot (Jamaica Regiment), raised in 1780
99th Regiment of Foot (1794), raised in 1794
99th Regiment of Foot (Prince of Wales's Tipperary Regiment), raised in 1804 and renumbered as the 98th in 1816
99th Regiment of Foot (Prince Regent's County of Dublin Regiment), renumbered from the 100th in 1816
99th Duke of Edinburgh's (Lanarkshire) Regiment of Foot, raised in 1824